Eugenio Montero Ríos (13 November 1832, in Santiago de Compostela – 12 May 1914, in Madrid) was a leading member of the Spanish Liberal Party before being part of a 1903 schism that divided it. He also served briefly as Prime Minister of Spain. He played a role in the 1898 Treaty of Paris that ended the Spanish–American War as he was then President of the Senate of Spain.

References 

Prime Ministers of Spain
Justice ministers of Spain
Members of the Senate of Spain
Liberal Party (Spain, 1880) politicians
People of the Spanish–American War
Politicians from Galicia (Spain)
People from Santiago de Compostela
1832 births
1914 deaths
Presidents of the Senate of Spain
Presidents of the Supreme Court of Spain